Reversed Tse (Ꙡ ꙡ; italics: Ꙡ ꙡ) is a letter of the Cyrillic script, representing a horizontally reversed Tse (Ц ц Ц ц).

Reversed Tse was used in the Old Novgorodian birchbark letters, along with other reversed letters. It is an allograph of Tse and denotes the same sound – voiceless alveolar sibilant affricate [t͡s]. In the language of Novgorod and its environs the difference between ц [t͡s] and ч [t͡ʃ] had been eliminated, and ꙡ replaces both these letters in the documents.

Example text 
Novgorod birch-bark letter № 439 (turn of the 13th century):

Computing codes

See also
Cyrillic characters in Unicode

References